Calcot, or Calcot Row, is a former village, now a suburb west of Reading in Berkshire, England. Calcot straddles the historic A4 Bath Road and is between the former hamlet of Horncastle, and Junction 12 of the M4. Tilehurst is to the north, and the village of Theale is to the west, across the motorway. Its named neighbourhoods include Beansheaf Farm and Fords Farm south of the centre developed in the early 21st century.

Local government
Although now a suburb of Reading, Calcot is not within the Borough of Reading. Rather it is split between the civil parishes of Holybrook and Tilehurst Without, with that part of Calcot north of the Bath Road in Tilehurst parish and that part south in Holybrook parish. The whole of Holybrook parish and the part of Calcot within Tilehurst parish, form the Calcot electoral ward of the unitary authority of West Berkshire. Both parishes have elected parish councils and, together with the unitary authority, are responsible for different aspects of local government. Calcot is part of the Reading West parliamentary constituency.

Statistics
The Calcot ward of West Berkshire has an area of 324 ha and a total population of 9,093 living in 3,554 dwellings.

Schools
Calcot has two primary schools serving pupils aged 4 to 11. Serving the Beansheaf and Fords Farm communities to the south of the A4 Bath Road is Kennet Valley Primary School while north of the A4, both sharing the same grounds, are Calcot Junior School and Calcot Infant School, which incorporates a nursery. When children leave primary school at 11 they attend secondary schools in neighbouring villages.

Places of interest
Calcot Park is a large country house and estate, to the north east of Calcot. Over the years the estate has been the home to Peter Vanlore, Frances Kendrick, and to John Blagrave, a relative of the mathematician John Blagrave, who built the present house in 1759. Today the house has been converted into apartments and the grounds have become a golf course.

Calcot Mill is a former watermill on the Holy Brook. It was built on the site of a mill originally owned by Reading Abbey and has been converted into apartments. 

Pincent's Kiln is an Site of Special Scientific Interest (SSSI) on the western border of the area.

Shopping

Calcot is home to two large shopping complexes - the SavaCentre and the Pincents Lane Retail Park and has a car dealers between the two; all close to Junction 12 of the M4 motorway. In September 1981, an  hypermarket, a BHS and Sainsbury's joint enterprise, opened up. At the time, it was one of the largest hypermarkets in the United Kingdom. This store featured in the SavaCentre TV adverts in 1983. In August 1998, it was re-modelled, to provide a greater emphasis on food, at a cost £26m. The SavaCentre was downsized and re-branded as Sainsbury's in 2005, with the extension being sold off to Next. A further refurbishment took placein 2008.

At the same time, the SavaCentre site was rebranded as the Calcot Retail Park, with branches of Sports Direct, Boots and McDonald's opening up. In 2015, an Argos in-store concession opened up inside Sainsbury's. However, the SavaCentre name is still more commonly used by the locals. On the other side of the car dealers, was the Pincents Lane Retail Park. This was anchored by a branch of Homebase, but also featuring a branch of Dunelm Mill, Carpetright, Utopia Nightclub and Reading Megabowl bowling alley. In 2015, the retail park was demolished (apart from the Dunelm Mill store) and a new branch of IKEA was opened in its place in July 2016. The original plan was for a three-storey  store, but in the end a reduced  store over two floors was built because of the growth in online shopping.

Transport
Calcot is east of the M4 motorway. Local bus services are provided by Reading Buses.

Notable people
In 1881 the American post-impressionist painter John Singer Sargent spent the summer with his family in the village.

References 

Suburbs of Reading, Berkshire
Tilehurst
West Berkshire District